James Hawkes may refer to:

 James B. Hawkes (1857-1936), Canadian politician
 Jim Hawkes (born 1934), Canadian politician
 James Hawkes (congressman) (1776–1865), American politician from New York
 James S. Hawkes (1856–1918), Australian accountant and civil engineer
 James Hawkes (missionary) (1853–1932), missionary in Persia